St Joseph College of Bulacan was a private higher education institution located in San Jose Patag, Santa Maria, Bulacan, Republic of the Philippines.

Programs
New Programs:
Bachelor in Physical Education;
Bachelor of Science in Accountancy;
Bachelor of Science in Information System;
Bachelor of Science in Tourism Management;
Diploma in Midwifery

Programs Offered:
Master of Arts in Education (Educational Management), in consortium with Bulucan State University,
Bachelor of Science in Business Administration, Major in : Financial, Human Resource, and Operations Management, 
Bachelor of Science in Hotel And Restaurant Management, 
Bachelor of Arts in Psychology,
Bachelor of Science in Computer Science,
Bachelor of Elementary Education, Major in Early Childhood Education,
Bachelor of Secondary Education, Major in: English, Filipino, Mathematics

Short-term / Non-degree Programs
Teachers Certificate Program, 
Associate in Computer Technology, 
Caregiver NCII, 
Health Care Services NCII, 
Diploma in Hotel and Restaurant Services, 
Certificate in Housekeeping NCII, 
Primary / Secondary school

External links
 St. Joseph College of Bulacan

Universities and colleges in Bulacan
Education in Santa Maria, Bulacan
Private schools in the Philippines
1996 establishments in the Philippines